The  Burlington Barracudas were a professional women's ice hockey team based in Burlington, Ontario. They were one of the founding teams of the Canadian Women's Hockey League (CWHL) from its inaugural season in 2007 until 2012. The Barracudas’ home ice was Appleby Ice Center in Burlington.

History
Burlington Barracudas defenceman Ashley “ Stretch “ Johnston was the youngest Ontarian player to play in the 2009–10 CWHL season. The team failed to qualify for the playoffs in the 2010–11 season.

Season-by-season results 
Note: Finish = Rank in league at end of regular season; GP = Games played, W = Wins (2 points), OTL = Overtime losses (1 point), L = Losses, GF = Goals for, GA = Goals against, Pts = Points, Top scorer: Points (Goals+Assists)Sources: Collins gem Hockey Facts and Stats 2009-10, p.553, Andrew Podnieks, Harper Collins Publishers Ltd, Toronto, Ontario, Canada, 

Community events
On November 18, 2011, several Burlington Barracudas players (including Christina Kessler, Shannon Moulson, Ashley Stephenson, Jana Harrigan, Amanda Shaw, Annina Rajahuhta, Samantha Shirley, Amanda Parkins, and Lindsay Vine) competed in the first ever Hockey Helps the Homeless Women's Tournament. Said tournament was held at the Magna Centre in Newmarket, Ontario.
Barracudas players Christina Kessler and Shannon Moulson were part of an event at Power Play Sports in Niagara Falls, Ontario on December 20, 2011 to promote the 2012 Clarkson Cup (to be held in Niagara Falls). After the event, they met players from the NFGHA (Niagara Falls Girls Hockey League) for photographs and autographs.

Awards and honors

2007-08

CWHL Top Players
 Top Defender: Becky Kellar, Burlington

CWHL All-Stars
Central All-Stars
 Defender: Becky Kellar, Burlington
 Forward: Jana Harrigan, Burlington

Monthly Top Scorers
 November: Jana Harrigan, Burlington (5+3=8 points, 5 games)

2008-09

CWHL Top Players
 Top Defender: Becky Kellar, Burlington

Draft history

2010 Draft
The following were players selected by the Barracudas in the 2010 CWHL Draft. Because the league contracted from six to five teams, it was possible for some teams to reacquire players.

Protected players

Roster 2011–12

Reference

Coaching staff 2011-12

    General Manager: Maria Quinto 
    Head Coach:  Berardino Quinto 
    Assistant Coach:  Jessica Rattle
    Equipment Manager: Diane Cruickshanks & Madelaine Bird
    Marketing Coordinator: Deanne Johnstone
    Head Athletic Therapist: Nancy Spence  
    Assistant Athletic Therapist: Glenn Burke 
    Assistant Athletic Therapist:'' Carm Chan

Reference

Olympians

References

External links
 Burlington Barracudas on CWHL Website 

Ice hockey clubs established in 2007
Women's ice hockey teams in Canada
Ice hockey teams in Ontario
Canadian Women's Hockey League teams
Burlington, Ontario
2007 establishments in Ontario
Women in Ontario
2012 disestablishments in Ontario
Ice hockey clubs disestablished in 2012